The Neptune Investment Management Novices' Hurdle was the sponsored title of the following horse races;

Hyde Novices' Hurdle, a race run at Cheltenham in November
Winter Novices' Hurdle, a race run at Sandown Park Racecourse in December
Leamington Novices' Hurdle, a race run at Warwick in January
Classic Novices' Hurdle, a race run at Cheltenham in January
Baring Bingham Novices' Hurdle, a race run at Cheltenham in March